Andrea Milani (born December 13, 1919) was an Italian professional football player.

1919 births
Year of death missing
Italian footballers
Serie A players
Serie B players
Inter Milan players
Palermo F.C. players
Brescia Calcio players
Hellas Verona F.C. players
Association football midfielders